The 1991 World Rally Championship was the 19th season of the Fédération Internationale de l'Automobile (FIA) World Rally Championship (WRC). The season consisted of 14 rallies. The drivers' world championship was won by Juha Kankkunen in a Lancia Delta Integrale 16V, ahead of Carlos Sainz and Didier Auriol. The manufacturers' title was won by Lancia, ahead of Toyota and Mitsubishi.

Calendar

Teams and drivers

Standings

Points scoring system

Drivers' championship

Manufacturers' championship

Events

External links 

 FIA World Rally Championship 1991 at ewrc-results.com
 Season 1991 at World Rally Archive

World Rally Championship
World Rally Championship seasons